We Are from Jazz is a 1983 Soviet comedy musical film by Karen Shahnazarov.

Plot 
A student is expelled from music school because he loves jazz, and jazz at that time (the film depicts the 1920s) is the kind of music that represents American capitalism. He hires two street musicians to form a band, and goes from one city to another trying to gain fame.

Cast 
 Igor Sklyar as Konstantin Ivanov
 Aleksandr Pankratov-Chyorny as Stepan Arkadyevich Grushko
 Nikolai Averyushkin as Georgy (Jora) Ryabov
 Pyotr Shcherbakov as Ivan Ivanovich Bavurin 
 Yelena Tsyplakova as Katya Bobrova (aka Isabella Fox)
 Yevgeniy Yevstigneyev as Papa, pickpocket and jazz lover
 Leonid Kuravlyov as Samsonov, head of the Association of proletarian musicians
 Borislav Brondukov as fake of Captain Kolbasyev
 Larisa Dolina as Clementine Fernandez, Cuban singer
 Yuri Vasilyev as Orlov, jazz band leader
 Alexander Pyatkov as Yaryshkin, waiter

Interesting facts 
 The film was distribution leader in the USSR in 1983 with 17.1 million viewers.
 The historical records of music of the 1920s were used in the filming.
 The role of Kostya Ivanov was originally intended for Dmitry Kharatyan. Yevgeny Dvorzhetsky and Mikhail Shirvindt were also auditioned for the role. 
 Lyubov Polishchuk was auditioned for the role of Clementine.
 Nikolai Yeremenko Jr. and Leonid Yarmolnik were auditioned for the role of Stepan.
 The operator Vladimir Shevtsik sings for the role of Alexander Pankratov-Cherny in the film.
 Larisa Dolina was in the fifth month of pregnancy during the filming.

References

External links

 We Are From Jazz online at official Mosfilm site (with English subtitles)

1983 films
Mosfilm films
1980s musical comedy films
1980s Russian-language films
Films directed by Karen Shakhnazarov
Russian musical comedy films
Soviet musical comedy films
1983 comedy films